The 2017 Morehead State Eagles football team represented Morehead State University in the 2017 NCAA Division I FCS football season. They were led by fifth-year head coach Rob Tenyer and played their home games at Jayne Stadium. They were members of the Pioneer Football League. They finished the season 4–7, 3–5 in PFL play to finish in a tie for eighth place.

Schedule

Game summaries

Kentucky Christian

at Liberty

at Austin Peay

Dayton

at Campbell

Butler

at San Diego

Stetson

at Valparaiso

at Marist

Davidson

References

Morehead State
Morehead State Eagles football seasons
Morehead State Eagles football